Depeche Mode has received five Grammy Award nominations. The band's first Grammy nomination occurred when "Devotional" was nominated for Grammy Award for Best Long Form Music Video in 1995. Depeche Mode has also received Grammy nominations for Best Dance Recording for "I Feel Loved", "Suffer Well" and "Wrong". On 2 November 2006, Depeche Mode received the MTV Europe Music Award in the Best Group category, the band won the first Q magazine "Innovation Award" on 22 October 2002. "Enjoy the Silence" won 'Best British single' at the 1991 Brit Awards. The band was ranked No. 144 on Acclaimed Music's list of The Top 1000 Artists of All Time. In 2020, January, Depeche Mode was announced among the four inductees of the 35th Rock and Roll Hall of Fame inductees.

ASCAP Pop Music Awards

!Ref.
|-
| 1991
| "Enjoy the Silence"
| Most Performed Song
| 
|

Antville Music Video Awards

|-
| rowspan="2" | 2009
| rowspan="2" | "Wrong"
| Best Narrative Video
| 
|-
| Best Cinematography
|

BMI London Awards

|-
| 2007
| "Precious"
| Pop Award 
|

Beatport Music Awards

|-
| style="text-align:center;"| 2010 || Hole To Feed (Popof Vocal Mix) || Best Techno Track || 
|-

Billboard Music Awards

!Ref.
|-
| rowspan=4|1985
| rowspan=3|Themselves
| Top Hot 100 Artist
| 
| rowspan=4|
|-
| Top Billboard 200 Artist
| 
|-
| Top Billboard 200 Artist - Duo/Group
| 
|-
| Some Great Reward
| Top Billboard 200 Album
| 
|-
| rowspan=3|1987
| Themselves
| Top Dance Club Play Artist
| 
| rowspan=3|
|-
| rowspan=2|"Strangelove"
| Top Dance Club Play Single
| 
|-
| Top Dance Sales 12' Single
| 
|-
| rowspan=2|2007
| Themselves
| Top Electronic Artist
| 
|rowspan=2|
|-
| The Best of Depeche Mode Volume 1
| rowspan=2|Top Electronic Album
| 
|-
| rowspan=2|2009
| Sounds of the Universe
| 
| rowspan=2|
|-
| Themselves
| Top Electronic Artist
|

Bravo Otto Awards

|-
| 1986
| rowspan=2|Themselves
| rowspan=2|Best Rock Group (Bronze)
| 
|-
| 1987
|

Brit Awards

|-
| 1982 || Themselves || Best British Newcomer|| 
|-
|rowspan="2"|  ||rowspan="2"| Enjoy the Silence || Best British Single|| 
|-
| Best British Video|| 
|-
|  || I Feel You || Best British Video||

Camerimage

!Ref.
|-
| rowspan=2|2009
|rowspan=2|"Wrong"
| Best Music Video
| 
|
|-
| Best Cinematography
| 
|

Classic Pop Readers' Awards

!Ref.
|-
| 2018
| rowspan=2|Themselves
| rowspan=2|Group of the Year
| 
| 
|-
| 2019
| 
| 
|-
| 2020
| Black Celebration / Music for the Masses 12' Singles Collection Boxset
| Compilation of the Year
| 
|

D&AD Awards

|-
| 2010
| "Wrong"
| Music Video
|style="background:#BF8040"| Wood Pencil

Echo Award

|-
| 1998
| rowspan="5" | Themselves 
| rowspan="5" | Best International Group
| rowspan="7" 
|-
| 1999
|-
| 2002
|-
| 2006
|-
| 2007
|-
| 2007
| Touring the Angel
| Music DVD of the Year
|-
| 2010
| Sounds of the Universe
| Album of the Year
|-
| 2010
| rowspan="2" | Themselves 
| rowspan="2" | Best International Group
| rowspan="2" 
|-
| 2014
|-
| 2014
| Delta Machine
| Album of the Year
| rowspan="2" 
|-
| 2018
| Themselves 
| Best International Group

GAFFA Awards

Denmark GAFFA Awards
Delivered since 1991, the GAFFA Awards are a Danish award that rewards popular music by the magazine of the same name.

!
|-
| 2001
| rowspan="2" | Depeche Mode
| Foreign Live Name
| 
| style="text-align:center;" rowspan="3"|
|-
| rowspan="2"| 2005
| Best Foreign Band
| 
|-
| Playing The Angel
| Best Foreign Album
| 
|}

Sweden GAFFA Awards
Delivered since 2010, the GAFFA Awards (Swedish: GAFFA Priset) are a Swedish award that rewards popular music awarded by the magazine of the same name.

!
|-
| 2018
| Depeche Mode
| Best Foreign Band
| 
| style="text-align:center;" |
|}

Grammy Awards

|-
| 1995 || Devotional || Best Long Form Music Video || 
|-
| 2001 || "I Feel Loved" || rowspan="2"|Best Dance Recording || 
|-
| 2006 || "Suffer Well" || 
|-
|rowspan="2"| 2010 || Sounds of the Universe || Best Alternative Music Album || 
|-
| "Wrong" || Best Short Form Music Video || 
|-
| 2018 || "You Move" (Latroit remix) || Grammy Award for Best Remixed Recording, Non-Classical ||

Hungarian Music Awards

|-
| 1998
| Ultra
| Best Foreign Album
| 
|-
| 2001
| Exciter
| Best Foreign Rock Album
| 
|-
| 2005
| Remixes 81–04
| rowspan="2"|Best Foreign Dance Album
| 
|-
| 2006
| Playing the Angel
| 
|-
| 2010
| Sounds of the Universe
| Pop-Rock Album of the Year 
| 
|-
| 2012
| Themselves 
| Electronic Music Production of the Year
| 
|-
| 2014
| Delta Machine
| Pop-Rock Album of the Year
|

International Dance Music Awards

|-
| style="text-align:left;"|2005
| Remixes 81–04
| Best CD Compilation 
|
|-
| 2006
| rowspan="2"|Themselves 
| rowspan="2"|Best Dance Artist (Group)
|
|-
| 2007
|
|-
|rowspan="2"| 2010 || rowspan="2"| "Wrong" || Best Electro Track || 
|-
| Best Music Video ||

Ivor Novello Awards

|-
| style="text-align:center;"| 1994 || I Feel You || International Hit of the Year || 
|-
| style="text-align:center;"| 1999 || Martin Gore || International Achievement || 
|-

Lunas del Auditorio

|-
| style="text-align:center;"| 2010 || rowspan="2"|Themselves || rowspan="2"|Best Rock in Foreign Language || 
|-
| style="text-align:center;"| 2018
|

MTV Europe Music Awards

|-
| style="text-align:center;"| 2001 || rowspan="4"|Themselves || Best Band Website || 
|-
| style="text-align:center;"| 2002 || Best Live Act || 
|-
| style="text-align:center;"| 2006 || Best Group || 
|-
| style="text-align:center;"| 2007 || Best Inter Act || 
|-

MTV Russian Music Awards

|-
| 2006
| Themselves 
| Best International Act
|

MTV Video Music Awards

|-
| style="text-align:center;"|  || Personal Jesus || Best Post-Modern Video || 
|-
| style="text-align:center;"|  || I Feel You || Best Group Video || 
|-

Meteor Music Awards

|-
| style="text-align:center;"| 2006 || Playing the Angel || Best International Album || 
|-

MidemNet Awards

|-
| style="text-align:center;"| 2001 || Themselves || Best Artist Site Award || 
|-

Music Television Awards

|-
| rowspan="2" | 1993
| Songs of Faith and Devotion
| Best Album
| 
|-
| rowspan="2" | Themselves 
| Best Group
| 
|-
| rowspan="2" | 1997
| Best Alternative 
| 
|-
| Ultra
| rowspan="2" | Best Album
| 
|-
| rowspan="2" | 2001
| Exciter
| 
|-
| rowspan="3" | Themselves 
| rowspan="2" | Best Group
| 
|-
| rowspan="3" | 2006
| 
|-
| Best Alternative
| 
|-
| Playing the Angel
| Best Album
|

Music Video Production Awards

|-
| 2012
| "Personal Jesus"
| Best Alternative Video 
| 
|-
| 2013
| "Soothe My Soul"
| Best Director of a Band 
|

Pollstar Concert Industry Awards

|-
| 1987
| Themselves 
| Next Major Arena Headliner 
|

Popkomm Award

|-
| style="text-align:center;"| 2002 || One Night In Paris || Popkomm Music DVD Award || 
|-

Porin

!Ref.
|-
| style="text-align:center;"| 2011
| Tour of the Universe: Barcelona 20/21.11.09
| Best International Video
| 
|

Q Awards

|-
| style="text-align:center;" | 2002 || rowspan="3" | Themselves || Innovation Award || 
|-
| rowspan="2" | 2017
| Best Act in the World Today
| 
|-
| Best Live Act
| 
|-

Rober Awards Music Poll

|-
| 2009
| "Wrong"
| Best Promo Video 
|

Rockbjornen

|-
| style="text-align:center;"| 1990 || Themselves || Best Foreign Group || 
|-

Rock and Roll Hall of Fame

! Ref.
|-
| 2020
| Depeche Mode
| Rock and Roll Hall of Fame 
| 
|

Side-Line Music Awards

|-
|rowspan="2"| 2010 ||rowspan="2"| Themselves || Best Band || 
|-
| Best Live Band || 
|-

Smash Hits Poll Winners' Party

|-
| 1982
| A Broken Frame
| Best Album
| 
|-
| 1983
| rowspan="4"|Themselves 
| rowspan="4"|Best Group
| 
|-
| 1984
| 
|-
| 1985
| 
|-
| 1986
|

UK Music Video Awards

|-
|rowspan="2"| 2009 ||rowspan="2"| Wrong || Best Rock Video || 
|-
| Best Visual Effects in a Video || 
|-
| 2011 || Personal Jesus 2011 || Best Alternative Video || 
|-

Viva Comet Awards

|-
| style="text-align:center;"| 2001 || Themselves || Best International Artist || 
|-

Žebřík Music Awards

!Ref.
|-
| rowspan=2|1997
| "Barrel of a Gun"
| Best International Video
| 
| rowspan=13|
|-
| rowspan=4|Themselves
| rowspan=2|Best International Surprise
| 
|-
| rowspan=4|1998
| 
|-
| Best International Group
| 
|-
| Best International Enjoyment
| 
|-
| rowspan=3|Dave Gahan
| rowspan=2|Best International Male
| 
|-
| rowspan=7|2001
| 
|-
| Best International Personality
| 
|-
| rowspan=2|Themselves
| Best International Group
| 
|-
| Best International Surprise
| 
|-
| Exciter
| Best International Album
| 
|-
| "Dream On"
| Best International Song
| 
|-
| "I Feel Loved"
| rowspan=2|Best International Video
| 
|-
| rowspan=5|2005
| rowspan=2|"Precious"
| 
| rowspan=20|
|-
| Best International Song
| 
|-
| Themselves
| Best International Group
| 
|-
| Dave Gahan
| Best International Male
| 
|-
| Playing the Angel
| Best International Album
| 
|-
| rowspan=4|2006
| Themselves
| Best International Group
| 
|-
| "Martyr"
| Best International Song
| 
|-
| Touring the Angel: Live in Milan
| Best International Music DVD
| 
|-
| rowspan=3|Dave Gahan
| rowspan=3|Best International Male
| 
|-
| 2007
| 
|-
| rowspan=2|2008
| 
|-
| rowspan=2|Themselves
| rowspan=2|Best International Group
| 
|-
| rowspan=4|2009
| 
|-
| Sounds of the Universe
| Best International Album
| 
|-
| "Wrong"
| Best International Video
| 
|-
| rowspan=2|Dave Gahan
| rowspan=2|Best International Male
| 
|-
| rowspan=4|2010
| 
|-
| Themselves
| Best International Group
| 
|-
| Sounds of the Universe
| Best International Album
| 
|-
| Tour of the Universe: Barcelona 20/21.11.09
| Best International Music DVD
| 
|-
| 2011
| rowspan=2|Dave Gahan
| rowspan=2|Best International Male
| 
| rowspan=7|
|-
| rowspan=4|2013
| 
|-
| Delta Machine
| Best International Album
| 
|-
| rowspan=3|Themselves
| Best International Group
| 
|-
| rowspan=2|Best International Live
| 
|-
| 2014
| 
|-
| 2015
| Dave Gahan
| Best International Male
|

Miscellaneous awards and honors

References

External links
 

Awards
Lists of awards received by British musician
Lists of awards received by musical group